Ee-mat-la, also known as King Phillip, (9 October 1739 - 8 October 1839) was a Seminole chief during the Second Seminole War.

He was captured while camped at Dunlawton plantation, and held at Fort Marion.  He died while being transported west in 1839.

He was "also a very aged chief, who has been a man of great notoriety and distinction in his time, but has now got too old for further warlike enterprize."

His son was Coacoochee (Wild Cat).

References

External links
Ee-mat-la, Catlin sketch, Ayer Art Digital Collection (Newberry Library)
Seminolee. 154-156. Ee-mat-la (King Phillip), Ye-how-lo-gee (the Cloud), Co-ee-ha-jo (- - -), three Seminolee warriors w... (1850), NYPL digital library
ee-mat-la, George Catlin, Smithsonian American Art Museum
Ruins of sugar mill, Dunlawton plantation
FLORIDA 32) Dunlawton Plantation Sugar Mill Ruins, National Register of Historic Places
Battle of Dunlawton Plantation - Port Orange, FL

1739 births
1839 deaths
Pre-statehood history of Florida
Native American leaders
Native Americans of the Seminole Wars
18th-century Seminole people
19th-century Seminole people
Native Americans imprisoned at Fort Marion